Yang Chengwu (October 27, 1914 – February 14, 2004), alias Yang Nengjun was a Communist Chinese revolutionary and general of the People's Liberation Army. He was the Deputy Chief of General Staff of the People's Liberation Army from 1954-1965 and 1974–1980. He was named Acting Chief of General Staff in 1966 after Luo Ruiqing was purged at the beginning of the Cultural Revolution.

Yang was born in Changting County, Fujian Province of China on October 8, 1914.
He died on February 14, 2004, in Beijing, at the age of 90.

Yang Chengwu's son Yang Dongming is a retired lieutenant general who was appointed Deputy Commander of the People's Liberation Army Air Force (PLAAF) in 2005.

References

1914 births
2004 deaths
Politicians from Longyan
People's Liberation Army generals from Fujian
Chinese Communist Party politicians from Fujian
People's Republic of China politicians from Fujian
People's Liberation Army Chiefs of General Staff
Hakka generals
Vice Chairpersons of the National Committee of the Chinese People's Political Consultative Conference
Burials at Babaoshan Revolutionary Cemetery